Wu Di may refer to:

Wu Di (cinematographer), Chinese cinematographer
Wu Di (film critic and historian) (born 1951), Chinese film critic and historian
Di Wu (pianist) (born 1984), Chinese-American pianist

Sportspeople
Wu Di (renju player) (born 1979), Chinese renju player
Wu Di (softball) (born 1982), Chinese female softball player
Wu Di (tennis) (born 1991), Chinese male tennis player
Wu Di (basketball) (born 1993), Chinese female basketball player

See also
Wu Di, atonal pinyin for the legendary Five Emperors of early China
 Emperor Wu (disambiguation)
 Wudi (disambiguation)